Bayless Quarters, near North Middletown, Kentucky, was listed on the National Register of Historic Places in 1983.  The listing included three contributing buildings.

It includes Greek Revival and Federal architecture.

The main structure is a one-story two-bay dry stone quarters.  A smokehouse is also included.

References

National Register of Historic Places in Bourbon County, Kentucky
Federal architecture in Kentucky
Greek Revival architecture in Kentucky
Slave cabins and quarters in the United States
Residential buildings on the National Register of Historic Places in Kentucky
African-American history of Kentucky